Hayate Matsubara (born 5 December 1991) is a Japanese swimmer. He competed in the men's 200 metre backstroke event at the 2018 FINA World Swimming Championships (25 m), in Hangzhou, China.

References

External links
 

1991 births
Living people
Japanese male backstroke swimmers
Place of birth missing (living people)
21st-century Japanese people